McPherson Creek is a  long 1st order tributary to Chartiers Creek in Washington County, Pennsylvania.

Course
McPherson Creek rises about 0.5 miles south of Cecil, Pennsylvania, and then flows southeasterly to join Chartiers Creek about 1 mile southeast of Hendersonville.

Watershed
McPherson Creek drains  of area, receives about 38.7 in/year of precipitation, has a wetness index of 336.87, and is about 51% forested.

See also
 List of rivers of Pennsylvania

References

Rivers of Pennsylvania
Rivers of Washington County, Pennsylvania